The Strong Republic Transit System was launched to integrate the various rail lines providing public transport in Manila in the Philippines. The program was initiated by President Gloria Macapagal Arroyo on June 14, 2003. It aimed to provide a "reliable, seamless and integrated mass transit system that would be at par with international standards" through the unification of already-existing rail infrastructure under one transit system and fare structure. The Manila Light Rail Transit System (Line 1 and Line 2), the Manila Metro Rail Transit System (Line 3) and the Philippine National Railways (PNR) Northrail and Southrail lines were covered by the SRTS project.

Links
The SRTS project provided for seven "links", i.e. interchange stations where commuters would be able to seamlessly transfer from one line to the other. When the program was initiated four links were in use. The Santa Mesa and Recto Link were added in April 2004, when the  already under construction Line 2 became fully operational. The Northrail project has been cancelled in September 2012, as a result the Caloocan Link is missing. The proposed extension of Southrail services to Caloocan, which was part of SRTS, was not executed either. The closing of the loop has as of 2015 almost been completed by extending Line 1 with five new stations, unlike originally outlined by the plan. Line 1 would require one more station to connect it with Line 2. In order of operation the following links have been realized (color coding has since been changed):

Fare integration
The project aimed to unify fare systems on the lines through the use of contactless smart cards, similar to the Octopus card in Hong Kong and the EZ-Link card in Singapore. The integrated system has not been implemented, as the project was dropped. A weekly ticket which is valid on Lines 1-3 has been introduced in 2004 though. For ₱ 250 one can make an unlimited number of rides per day on Lines 1-3 during one calendar week with the so-called Flash Pass Card.

See also
List of rail transit stations in the Greater Manila Area
Manila Light Rail Transit System
Manila Light Rail Transit System Line 1 (Line 1)
Manila Light Rail Transit System Line 2 (Line 2)
Manila Metro Rail Transit System Line 3 (Line 3)
Philippine National Railways
PNR Metro Commuter (earlier names: Metro South Commuter, Orange Line, Metrotren, Commuter Express or Commex)

References

Public transportation in the Philippines
Rail transportation in Metro Manila
Rail transportation in the Philippines
Transportation in Luzon